Notter may refer to:

 Notter, Cornwall, a hamlet in England
 Notter, Netherlands, a hamlet
 Notter (Unstrut), a river in Thuringia, Germany, tributary of the Unstrut
 Notter Point, a rocky point in Antarctica

People with that surname
Joe Notter (1890-1973), American jockey
John L. Notter (born 1935), financier and developer
Heinrich Notter, Swiss bobsledder
Kastor Notter (1903–1950), Swiss racing cyclist